Jiangshan railway station is a railway station in Jiangshan, Quzhou, Zhejiang, China. It is an intermediate stop on the Hangzhou–Changsha section of the Shanghai–Kunming high-speed railway. It is also the southern terminus of the currently under construction Hangzhou–Quzhou high-speed railway.

Railway stations in Zhejiang
Jiangshan